The ascent propulsion system (APS) or lunar module ascent engine (LMAE) is a fixed-thrust hypergolic rocket engine developed by Bell Aerosystems for use in the Apollo Lunar Module ascent stage. It used Aerozine 50 fuel, and  oxidizer. Rocketdyne provided the injector system, at the request of NASA, when Bell could not solve combustion instability problems.

Origins
The LMAE traces its origin to the earlier Bell Aerosystems engines (8096, 8247) used in the RM-81 Agena, the rocket upper stage and satellite support bus developed by Lockheed initially for the canceled WS-117L reconnaissance satellite program.
The Agena served as an upper stage for several defense, intelligence, and exploration programs:  SAMOS-E, SAMOS-F (ELINT Ferret)  and MIDAS (Missile Defense Alarm System) military early-warning satellites, Corona photo intelligence program, and the Ranger and Lunar Orbiter lunar probes.

The Lockheed Agena target vehicle using the Bell 8247 engine was qualified for 15 restarts for NASA's Project Gemini.

A total of 365 Agena rockets were launched by NASA and the U.S. Air Force between February 28, 1959, and the last Agena D launched on 12 February 1987, configured as the upper stage of a Titan 34B.

Development
During the spring of 1963, Grumman hired Bell to develop the lunar module ascent engine, on the assumption that Bell's experience in development of the Air Force Agena engine would be transferable to the lunar module requirements. Grumman placed heavy emphasis upon high reliability through simplicity of design, and the ascent engine emerged as the least complicated of the three main engines in the Apollo space vehicle, including the LM descent and CSM service propulsion system engines.

Embodying a pressure-fed fuel system using hypergolic (self-igniting) propellants, the ascent engine was fixed-thrust and nongimbaled, capable of lifting the ascent stage off the Moon or aborting a landing if necessary.

RS-18 Engine

Rocketdyne brought the lunar module ascent engine out of its 36-year retirement in 2008 for NASA's Exploration Systems Architecture Study (ESAS) engine testing, re-designated it as RS-18, and reconfigured the non-throttleable hypergolic engine to use LOX/methane.

References

External links 
 NASA Technical Note: Apollo Experience Report – Descent Propulsion System. March 1973 31 pages, much detail on both designs, and the testing.
 Apollo Lunar Module Propulsion Systems Overview, NASA

Rocket engines using hypergolic propellant
Apollo program hardware
Spacecraft propulsion
Rocket engines using the pressure-fed cycle